Dipulus is a genus of viviparous brotulas.

Species
There are currently four recognized species in this genus:
 Dipulus caecus Waite, 1905 (Orange eelpout)
 Dipulus hutchinsi Møller & Schwarzhans, 2006 (Hutchin's mudbrotula)
 Dipulus multiradiatus (McCulloch & Waite, 1918) (Slender blindfish)
 Dipulus norfolkanus Machida, 1993

References

Bythitidae
Taxa named by Edgar Ravenswood Waite
Marine fish genera